Hoyuelos de la Sierra is a village in the province of Burgos, Autonomous Community of Castilla y León (Spain), region of Sierra de la Demanda, judicial district of Salas, city of Salas de los Infantes.

Towns in Spain